Legislative elections were held in Mongolia on 29 June 2008. A total of 356 candidates ran for the 76 seats in the State Great Khural. According to official results published on 14 July, at least 39 seats were won by the ruling Mongolian People's Revolutionary Party (MPRP), and at least 25 seats by the main opposition party, the Democrats (DP). Ten seats remained subject to possible recounts.

Electoral system
Members of the State Great Khural were elected from multi-seat constituencies in a Plurality-at-large system, with two to four seats per aimag or (in Ulaanbaatar) düüreg. Previous elections had single-seat constituencies, and the new, more complicated voting system was reported to have led to a delay in vote counting.

Of the 76 seats, 20 were elected from Ulaanbaatar, and the other 56 were elected from the aimags. Mongolian voter registration is coupled with civil registration. Vote counting was manually done by hands and was not publicly done, and results of individual polling stations are not published. After the 2004 legislative elections had been contested in some constituencies, Mongolian voters now have their thumbs marked after casting their vote.

Campaign
311 candidates from 11 parties and one coalition, plus 45 independent candidates, were running for election, only 28 of them being incumbent MPs. Both the DP and the MPRP promised cash payouts in case of an election win. The DP promised 1,000,000 MNT (about  800 USD) per person in case of an election win. After first denouncing the idea of such payouts, the MPRP changed course and promised 1,500,000 MNT per person. Other issues were inflation and mining. As in previous elections, there were instances of candidates making monetary payments and other gifts to lure voters.

Results
According to results published on 14 July, the MPRP won at least 39 seats, the DP won at least 25, at least one seat was going to the Civic Will Party, and three seats were won by independent candidates. However, results from three constituencies (Khentii, Dornod, and Bayangol) were delayed. On 20 August, final results from Khentii were officially published, raising the number of MPRP seats to at least 42. Turnout was 74.3%, considerably lower than the 82% of the 2004 elections.

Allegations of fraud
After intermediate results published on 30 June showed MPRP victory, Democratic Party chairman Elbegdorj declared on 1 July that the elections were rigged and that his party would not accept the results. In a press conference held on 7 July, DP politicians Dambyn Dorligjav, Zandaakhuugiin Enkhbold and Lamjavyn Gündalai declared that there had been massive irregularities with voter registration. Some of their claims were later repudiated by the central registry office. Other allegations were irregularities in the counting process, and voter bribery.

For illegally using private documents of voters such as duplicating names of voters by (publishing duplicate IDs and false IDs with the names of dead people and so on) in 2008 parliamentary elections, L.Amarsanaa (MPRP), former chairman of State General Registration Authority was investigated by the Independent Authority Against Corruption and charged in September 2008.

Aftermath

Violence

On 1 July a peaceful gathering started in Sukhbaatar Square organized by the leaders of some of the smaller parties that took part in the elections. Eventually a large crowd gathered, mainly of young men, surrounding the adjacent MPRP  Headquarters. The group started throwing rocks at the building and eventually advancing on it. Smaller police force responded with  batons, water cannons, tear gas, rubber bullets, and live ammunition. In the evening fire started in the MPRP headquarters. Not enough measures to stop the riot or extinguish the fire were taken by the authority. Around midnight local time, after simply watching the live broadcast of the riot whole day on television channels, President Nambaryn Enkhbayar declared a state of emergency to be in effect for the following four days. Armored Personnel Carriers were deployed to the streets of Ulaanbaatar, a night curfew and a media blackout were declared.

Five people, all of them civilians, were killed during the state of emergency: four were shot, and one apparently died from carbon monoxide poisoning. The Mongolian Minister of Justice estimated 220 civilians and 108 service members were injured. Amnesty International raised concerns over the use of "unnecessary and excessive force" by the police.) Approximately 700 people were later arrested suspected to be being protesters, of whom 140, including 13 minors and 3 women, have been sentenced to 2–7 years in prison as of 31 October 2008.

On 15 and 19 August, ten police officers were arrested and charged in connection with the shootings in the night of 1 and 2 July. On 20 August, relatives of these arrested officers organized a protest demonstration on Sükhbaatar Square.

Political aftermath
On 18 July Democratic Party chairman Tsakhiagiin Elbegdorj said that the DP would boycott the opening session of the parliament on 23 July. He also said that he was prepared to resign as DP Chairman if the 200 protesters still being held by the police are not released and the political crisis did not end. However, the DP members were present in the opening session, with many of its members criticizing the Chairman of the General Elections Committee, and the way the elections were held. After Elbegdorj gave his party's position, members of the DP went out of the parliament. As a result, the new members of the parliament were not sworn in.

On 28 August, most of the DP representatives in the new State Great Khural (the Parliament) decided to attend the parliament, and all but Elbegdorj were sworn in. On 11 September, S. Bayar was elected as Prime Minister of a coalition government between MPRP and DP. Elbegdorj finally was sworn in on the same day.

The members from Dornod (two MPRP, one DP) were sworn in on 16 September 2008. The members from Bayangol (2 MPRP, 1 DP, 1 Civic Coalition) were announced on 9 October 2008.

On 2 September 2008, Elbegdorj resigned as the head of the Democratic Party as he said. Norovyn Altankhuyag was elected by the Democratic Party's National Consultative Committee as the next chairman, and the Democratic Party entered  a coalition government with the MPRP. On September 12, Elbegdorj was the only member of parliament who voted against Sanjaagiin Bayar as Mongolia's new prime minister. Bayar was the chairman of MPRP and Prime Minister who handled 2008 election rigging, riot and measures following riot including the police shooting to civilians that resulted in killing four people and wounded a dozen.

24 May 2009, nearly a year after the crisis, Tsakhiagiin Elbegdorj made victory in the 2009 presidential election over incumbent President Enkhbayar.

References

External links

Mongolia
Legislative election
Elections in Mongolia
2008 election
June 2008 events in Asia
Election and referendum articles with incomplete results